Chief Trembling Earth (Dakota name Monkaushka, died 1837) was Yankton Dakota chief. He and Wanata led in many encounters with the Iowa and Ojibwa tribes. He also acted as a delegate to Washington, D.C. On October 21, 1837, he and other native leaders signed a treaty selling land to government of the United States. 
 Trembling Earth became ill during his trip, and tried to return to his home, but died en route in Baltimore.

Notes

Year of birth unknown
1837 deaths
History of Baltimore
Native American leaders
Yankton Dakota people